The Tegtmeyer Site is a prehistoric rock art site located north of Piney Creek in Piney Creek Ravine State Natural Area in Randolph County, Illinois. The site consists of two petroglyphs painted on a sandstone rock shelter. One petroglyph depicts a winged anthropomorph in flight, while the other depicts a winged zoomorph which may also be flying. Based on their similarity to other sites from the period, the petroglyphs at the site most likely date from the Mississippian period. The petroglyphs resemble some of the figures painted at the nearby Piney Creek Site; given that the Tegtmeyer Site was unsuitable for inhabitation, it was most likely used for additional paintings which could not fit at the Piney Creek Site.

The site was added to the National Register of Historic Places on May 31, 2001.

References

Archaeological sites on the National Register of Historic Places in Illinois
Geography of Randolph County, Illinois
Rock shelters in the United States
Petroglyphs in Illinois
National Register of Historic Places in Randolph County, Illinois